The 1997 Pontiac Excitement 400 was the third stock car race of the 1997 NASCAR Winston Cup Series and the 32nd iteration of the event. The race was held on Sunday, March 2, 1997, in Richmond, Virginia, at Richmond International Raceway, a 0.75 miles (1.21 km) D-shaped oval. The race took the scheduled 400 laps to complete. In a controversial victory, Penske Racing South driver Rusty Wallace would manage to hold off the field on the final restart with three to go, scoring his 47th career NASCAR Winston Cup Series victory and his only victory of the season. To fill out the top three, Geoff Bodine Racing driver Geoff Bodine and Robert Yates Racing driver Dale Jarrett would finish second and third, respectively.

In post-race technical inspection, Wallace's engine was found to had failed to "meet compression ratio specifications" according to NASCAR technical inspector Kevin Triplett. At the time, the engine compression ratio was 14:1. On Monday, March 3, NASCAR would run another test. The official test results came to 14.001:1, which while slightly over, was within the guidelines and would allow Wallace to keep his victory.

Background 

Richmond International Raceway (RIR) is a 3/4-mile (1.2 km), D-shaped, asphalt race track located just outside Richmond, Virginia in Henrico County. It hosts the Monster Energy NASCAR Cup Series and Xfinity Series. Known as "America's premier short track", it formerly hosted a NASCAR Camping World Truck Series race, an IndyCar Series race, and two USAC sprint car races.

Entry list 

 (R) denotes rookie driver.

Qualifying 
Qualifying was originally scheduled to be held on Friday, February 28. However, due to rain, qualifying was cancelled. In 1997, NASCAR rules mandated that the top 33 spots were based on the 1996 owner's points, since the race was in the first four races of the season. The final 10 spots were based on postmarks on the official entry list. As a result, Terry Labonte, driving for Hendrick Motorsports, would win the pole.

Three drivers would fail to qualify: Billy Standridge, Greg Sacks, and Mike Wallace.

Full starting lineup

Race results

References 

1997 NASCAR Winston Cup Series
NASCAR races at Richmond Raceway
March 1997 sports events in the United States
1997 in sports in Virginia